Discogs (short for discographies) is a database of information about audio recordings, including commercial releases, promotional releases, and bootleg or off-label releases. While the site was originally created with a goal of becoming the largest online database of electronic music, the site now includes releases in all genres on all formats. After the database was opened to contributions from the public, rock music began to become the most prevalent genre listed.

 Discogs contains over 16 million releases, by over 8.4 million artists, across over 1.9 million labels, contributed from over 658,000 contributor user accounts – with these figures constantly growing as users continually add previously unlisted releases to the site over time. The Discogs servers, currently hosted under the domain name discogs.com, are owned by Zink Media, Inc. and located in Portland, Oregon, United States.

History
The discogs.com domain name was registered in August 2000, and Discogs itself was launched in November 2000 by programmer, DJ, and music fan Kevin Lewandowski originally intended to be a large database of electronic music.

Lewandowski's original goal was to build the most comprehensive database of electronic music, organized around the artists, labels, and releases available in electronic genres. In 2003, the Discogs system was completely rewritten, and in January 2004 it began to support other genres, starting with hip hop. Since then, it has expanded to include rock and jazz in January 2005 and funk/soul, Latin and reggae in October of the same year. In January 2006, blues and non-music (e.g. comedy records, field recordings, interviews) were added. Classical music started being supported in June 2007, and in September 2007 the "final genres were turned on" – adding support for the Stage & Screen, Brass & Military, Children's, and Folk, World, & Country music genres, allowing capture of virtually every single type of audio recording that has ever been released.

In June 2004, Discogs released a report claiming that it had 15,788 contributors and 260,789 releases.

In late 2005, the Discogs marketplace was launched.

In July 2007, a new system for sellers was introduced on the site called Market Price History. It made information available to users who paid for a subscriptionthough 60 days of information was freeaccess to the past price items were sold for up to 12 months ago by previous sellers who had sold exactly the same release. At the same time, the US$12 per year charge for advanced subscriptions was abolished, as it was felt that the extra features should be made available to all subscribers now that a different revenue stream had been found from sellers and purchasers. Later that year, all paid access features were discarded and full use of the site became free of charge, allowing all users to view the full 12-month Market Price History of each item.

Milestones
Discogs publishes information indicating the number of releases, labels, and artists presently in its database, along with its contributors:

* Master Release: from 30 April 2009 the function was made available.
† Contributors pages: in mid 2019 these pages were limited to show only the top 5000 users, with the total user count being made private, although the total user count figure was re-added sometime during early 2021 (also the About Us page mentions "More than 592,000..." have contributed the site.)

Other projects
Discogs has so far created a further six online databases, for collating information on related topics, although only one, VinylHub, remains in use.

VinylHub
In mid-2014, a side project website called VinylHub was started for users to add world-wide information about record stores including location, contact details, what type of items they stocked, etc. In August 2020 it was relocated as part of the main Discogs website, under subdomain vinylhub.discogs.com.

Previous projects
Five other online databases were previously created, however they have since closed.

Filmogs
In late 2014, the company released a new beta website called Filmogs. Users could add their physical film collections (on VHS, DVD, Blu-ray, LaserDisc, or any other type of physical film release) to the database, and buy and sell film releases in the global marketplace. The site was closed down on 31 August 2020.

Gearogs
Gearogs was launched as a beta in late 2014, at the same time as Filmogs. The site let users add and track music equipment, including items such as synths, drum machines, sequencers, samplers, audio software, and any other electronic music making equipment. The site was closed down on 31 August 2020.

Bibliogs/Bookogs
At the start of 2015, the company began Bibliogs as another beta project. Users could submit information about their books, physical or electronic, different versions and editions, and also connect different credits (writers, illustrators, translators, publishers, etc.) to these books. 21,000 books were submitted by the end of 2016. The project was in beta phase until 15 August 2017 when it reached more than 31,000 book titles, was renamed  Bookogs following legal issues with the original name, and removed 'Beta state' notice from the main page. The next day the Marketplace Beta feature was presented. On 8 June 2019, the project reached a total amount of 100,000 books. The site was closed down on 31 August 2020, counting more than 154,000 books and 345,000 credits.

Comicogs
Comicogs launched around the same time as Bookogs, as a means for comic collectors and enthusiasts to catalog their collections and create an archive of comic releases. Similar to Bookogs, users could contribute comics, manga, graphic novels, and strips to the database, along with information on credits, publishers, writers, etc. 18,000 comics were submitted by the start of 2018. The Comicogs marketplace was launched on 23 August 2017, allowing users to buy and sell comics from across the world. The site was closed down on 3 August 2020.

Posterogs
In September 2017, the company launched Posterogs. Posterogs was the only Discogs site to launch a database and marketplace simultaneously. The scope of Posterogs was left broad at the time of launch, with the company opting to let the community define what type of posters, flyers, or similar, should be included in the database. While non-music related items were fully acceptable for inclusion, much of the primary focus seemed to be on music posters, such as gig/tour posters, album promo posters, and promotional flyers (in keeping with Discogs' music theme), though there were also many film posters in the database. As with all other databases, users could save items to their 'Collection' and 'Wantlist', in addition to buying and selling in the marketplace. The site was closed down on 31 August 2020.

API
In mid-August 2007, Discogs data became publicly accessible via a RESTful, XML-based API and a license that allowed specially attributed use, but did not allow anyone to "alter, transform, or build upon" the data. The license has since been changed to a public domain one. Prior to the advent of this license and API, Discogs data was only accessible via the Discogs web site's HTML interface and was intended to be viewed only using web browsers. The HTML interface remains the only authorized way to modify Discogs data.

On 7 June 2011, version 2 of the API was released. Notable in this release was that a license key was no longer required, the default response was changed from XML to JSON, and the 5000 queries per day limit was removed (although a limit of 2000 image lookups per days was introduced).

On 1 November 2011, a major update to version 2 of the API was released. This new release dropped support for XML, data is always returned in JSON format, however the monthly data dumps of new data are only provided in XML format.

On 1 February 2014, Discogs modified their API so that image requests will now require OAuth authorization, requiring each user of third-party applications to have a Discogs "application ID", with image requests now limited to 1,000 per day. Additionally the Premium API service was dropped.

On 24 June 2014, Discogs deprecated their XML API in lieu of a JSON-formatted API.

Discogs also allows full XML downloads of its Release, Artist, and Label data through the data.discogs.com subdomain.

The recommendations API is not publicly available.

Contribution system

The data in Discogs comes from submissions contributed by users who have registered accounts on the site. The system has gone through four major revisions.

Version One (V1)
All incoming submissions were checked for formal and factual correctness by privileged users called "moderators", or "mods" for short, who had been selected by site management. Submissions and edits would not become visible or searchable until they received a single positive vote from a "mod". An even smaller pool of super-moderators called "editors" had the power to vote on proposed edits to artist and label data.

Version Two (V2)
This version introduced the concept of "submission limits" which prevented new users from submitting more than 2–3 releases for moderation. The number of possible submissions by a user increased on a logarithmic scale. The purpose of this was two-fold: 1) it helped keep the submission queue fairly small and manageable for moderators, and 2) it allowed the new user to acclimatise themselves slowly with the many formatting rules and guidelines of submitting to Discogs. Releases required a number of votes to be accepted into the database – initially the number of votes required was from four different moderators but in time the amount was decreased to three and then two.

Version Three (V3)
V3 launched in August 2007. Submission limits were eliminated, allowing each user to submit an unlimited number of updates and new entries. New releases added to the database were explicitly marked as "Unmoderated" with a top banner, and updates to existing items, such as releases, artists, or labels, were not shown (or available to search engines or casual visitors) until they were approved by the moderators.

Version Four (V4)
This system launched on 10 March 2008. New submissions and edits currently take effect immediately. Any time a new release is added or old release edited, that entry becomes flagged as needing "votes" (initially, "review," but this term caused confusion). A flagged entry is marked as a full yellow bar across a release in the list views and, like version three, a banner on the submission itself – although, initially, this banner was omitted.

Any item can be voted on at any time, even if it is not flagged. Votes consist of a rating of the correctness and completeness of the full set of data for an item (not just the most recent changes), as assessed by users who have been automatically determined, by an undisclosed algorithm, to be experienced and reliable enough to be allowed to cast votes. An item's "average" vote is displayed with the item's data.

The ranking system has also changed in v4. In v3, rank points were only awarded to submitters when a submission was "Accepted" by moderator votes. While in v4, rank points are now awarded immediately when a submission is made, regardless of the accuracy of the information and what votes it eventually receives, if any.

Discogs-aware metadata software

Tag editors

 ASMT MP3 Tagger – single release tagger
 foobar2000 – freeware media player and music management software with a plugin
 Helium Music Manager – music management software with a plugin
 Jaikoz – shareware OS X/Windows/Linux spreadsheet-based tag editor
 Kid3 – open-source project, tagger for all common music formats
 Mp3tag – freeware tag editor, batch and spreadsheet interfaces
 OrangeCD Catalog – music management software
 puddletag – a free and open-source tag editor written for PyQt
 taghycardia – freeware, automated MP3 tagger
 Tagog – Linux audio file tagger
 TagScanner – freeware tag editor with Discogs, FreeDB, TrackType.org support
 The GodFather – freeware tag editor
 The Tagger – MP3 and AAC formats tag editor for OS X
 TigoTago – spreadsheet-based tag editor

Other
 Album Art Downloader – Discogs cover art downloads
 Discogs Bar – Discogs navigation and search control toolbar for Firefox
 Discogs Enhancer – Discogs extension adding extra functionality to Google Chrome (inc. dark mode)
 Discographic for Discogs. Client for Apple devices for iOS
 MP3 Filenamer – online MP3 file name generator, based on Discogs release data
 Stecotec Musikverwaltung Pro – Music database software by stecotec.de 
 Music Collector – Music database software by collectorz.com
 WWW::Discogs – Perl module for interfacing with the Discogs API
 XLD (X Lossless Decoder) – a CD ripper and audio file converter for OS X

See also
 List of online music databases
 Global Electronic Music Marketplace

References

External links
 

American music websites
Companies based in Portland, Oregon
Internet properties established in 2000
Online music and lyrics databases
Social cataloging applications